Kamalia (Popular as City of Khaddar) is a tehsil in Toba Tek Singh District, Punjab, Pakistan. Kamalia is its capital city.

References

Toba Tek Singh District
Tehsils of Punjab, Pakistan